This page shows the results of the Gymnastics Competition at the 1983 Pan American Games, held in Caracas, Venezuela.

Men's events

Women's events

Medal table

See also 
 Pan American Gymnastics Championships
 South American Gymnastics Championships
 Gymnastics at the 1984 Summer Olympics

References 

1983
Events at the 1983 Pan American Games